The 1973 New York Cosmos season was the third season for the New York Cosmos in the now-defunct North American Soccer League. In the Cosmos' third year of existence, the club finished 2nd in the Eastern Division and 3rd in the overall league table.  In the playoffs, the Cosmos were defeated in their semifinal match by the Dallas Tornado.

Squad  

 

Source:

Results 
Source:

Friendlies

Preseason

Regular season 
Pld = Games Played, W = Wins, L = Losses, D = Draws, GF = Goals For, GA = Goals Against, Pts = Points
6 points for a win, 3 points for a draw, 0 points for a loss, 1 point for each goal scored (up to three per game).

Eastern Division Standings

Overall League Placing 

Source:

Matches

Postseason

Overview

Semi-finals

Final

Matches

References

See also
1973 North American Soccer League season
List of New York Cosmos seasons

New York
New York
New York Cosmos seasons
New York Cosmos